Alexander Arthur Henry Stitt (January 3, 1937 – October 2, 2016) was an Australian cartoonist, artist and celebrity whose work is well remembered in the Life. Be in it. campaign, as well as for Sid the Seagull, and Norm, both created for a variety of healthy living advertising campaigns. He was awarded a Member of the Order of Australia in early 2016. He also helped create and direct a number of animated feature films.

References 

Australian cartoonists
Members of the Order of Australia
1937 births
2016 deaths